DMHC can refer to:

California Department of Managed Health Care State of California government agency, United States.
Dickinson Mental Health Center in Pennsylvania, United States
Detroit Medical Health Connection in Michigan,  United States